795 Naval Air Squadron (795 NAS) was a Naval Air Squadron of the Royal Navy's Fleet Air Arm.

References

Citations

Bibliography

700 series Fleet Air Arm squadrons
Military units and formations established in 1942
Military units and formations of the Royal Navy in World War II
Military units and formations disestablished in 1947
1942 establishments in the United Kingdom
1947 disestablishments in the United Kingdom